Jean Piveteau (23 September 1899 – 7 March 1991) was a distinguished French vertebrate paleontologist.  He was elected to the French Academy of Sciences in 1956 and served as the institute's president in 1973.

References

External links 
Members of the French Academy of Sciences
Books by Jean Piveteau at Google Books

French anthropologists
Anthropology educators
Human evolution theorists
French paleoanthropologists
Officers of the French Academy of Sciences
French educators
Academic staff of the University of Paris
1899 births
1991 deaths
20th-century anthropologists